James Bannerman (1790–1858) was Governor of the Gold Coast.

James Bannerman may also refer to:

James Bannerman (broadcaster) (1902–1970), Canadian radio and television broadcaster
Hugh Bannerman (James William Hugh Bannerman, 1887–1917), New Zealand journalist, historian, cricketer and soldier
James Bannerman (theologian) (1807–1868), Scottish theologian